The 1976-77 IHF Women's Cup Winner's Cup was the first edition of IHF's competition for women's team handball national cup champions. It was contested by 13 teams and ran from 5 December 1977 to 29 April 1977. TSC Berlin defeated Spartak Baku in the final to become the competition's first champion.

Results

References

Women's EHF Cup Winners' Cup
1976 in handball
1977 in handball